Emmanuel Ndiemandoi (born 1953) is a Tanzanian long-distance runner. He competed in the marathon at the 1980 Summer Olympics.

References

1953 births
Living people
Athletes (track and field) at the 1980 Summer Olympics
Tanzanian male long-distance runners
Tanzanian male marathon runners
Olympic athletes of Tanzania
Athletes (track and field) at the 1978 Commonwealth Games
Athletes (track and field) at the 1982 Commonwealth Games
Commonwealth Games competitors for Tanzania
Place of birth missing (living people)